The Stargazers were a British vocal group, jointly founded in 1949 by Cliff Adams and Ronnie Milne. Other original members were Marie Benson, Fred Datchler and Dick James.  
                                                                                                                                                                                                           
Very shortly after the group made their first broadcasts with BBC Radio on such programmes as Workers' Playtime and The Goon Show, Dick James decided to resume his career as a solo vocalist, left the group, and was replaced by Bob Brown. Ronnie Milne took care of the musical arranging, while Cliff Adams became their manager, in addition to contributing scores for the group. In September 1953, Milne left the Stargazers to emigrate to Canada, and was replaced in the group by Dave Carey. The group served as backing vocalists for Petula Clark on her first recordings.

Commercial success
Recording for Decca, The Stargazers enjoyed considerable commercial success during the 1950s, including two United Kingdom number one hit singles on their own, "Broken Wings", which was the first recording by a native British act to top the UK Singles Chart (all previous number one singles were by American artists), and "I See the Moon", along with a third number one hit with Dickie Valentine on "The Finger of Suspicion", and were much in demand for back-up work and broadcast work.

In 1954, The Stargazers recorded "The Happy Wanderer" by F.W. Möller with Syd Dean and His Band, which reached number 12 in April of that year. Other UK chart hits included "Close the Door", which reached number 6 in September 1955, and "Twenty Tiny Fingers", which reached number 4 in November 1955. They were voted "most popular vocal group" by readers of the New Musical Express for five years running.

Stargazers' member Fred Datchler went on to form the Polkadots, who enjoyed success in their own right. Beyond their own hit singles and albums, which included a cover version of "April in Paris", the group recorded extensively with Jo Stafford, Peggy Lee and Frank Sinatra. One of Datchler's sons is Clark Datchler of Johnny Hates Jazz.

Discography

Albums 
 Presenting the Stargazers (Decca, 1954)
 South of the Border (Decca, 1959)
 Songs of Harry Lauder (with George Elrick) (London, 1960)
 The Very Best of the Stargazers (Universal/Spectrum, 1999)
 South of the Border and a Singles Compilation 1953–58 (Vocalion, 2003)

Singles

See also
List of artists under the Decca Records label
List of artists who reached number one on the UK Singles Chart

References

Musical groups established in 1949
English pop music groups
English vocal groups
English session musicians
Decca Records artists
1949 establishments in England